A town is a classification of municipalities used in the Canadian province of British Columbia.  British Columbia's Lieutenant Governor in Council may incorporate a community as a town by letters patent, under the recommendation of the Minister of Communities, Sport and Cultural Development, if its population is greater than 2,500 but not greater than 5,000 and the outcome of a vote involving affected residents was that greater than 50% voted in favour of the proposed incorporation.

British Columbia has 14 towns that had a cumulative population of 87,514 and an average population of 6,251 in the 2011 Census. British Columbia's largest and smallest towns are Comox and Port McNeill with populations of 13,627 and 2,505 respectively.

"Town" as a British Columbia municipal designation should not be confused with "township," which has no legal definition in the province. The three municipalities in British Columbia which refer to themselves as townships - Esquimalt, Langley, and Spallumcheen - are incorporated as district municipalities.

Of British Columbia's current 14 towns, the first to incorporate as a town was Ladysmith on June 3, 1904, while the most recent community to incorporate as a town was View Royal on December 5, 1988.

List

Former towns 
Fort Nelson, originally incorporated as a village on April 8, 1971, became a town on October 31, 1987 and then amalgamated with the Northern Rockies Regional District on February 6, 2009 to form the Northern Rockies Regional Municipality.

Kinnaird, originally incorporated as a village on August 6, 1948, became a town on August 5, 1967, and then amalgamated with the Town of Castlegar on January 1, 1974, to form the City of Castlegar.

Mission City, originally incorporated as a village on December 12, 1939, became a town on January 1, 1958, and then amalgamated with the District of Mission on November 1, 1969.

Town status eligibility 
As of the 2021 Census, two villages – Cumberland and Pemberton – meet the requirement of having a population greater than 2,500 to incorporate as a town.

City status eligibility 
As of the 2021 Census, nine of the above towns – Comox, Creston, Ladysmith, Oliver, Osoyoos, Qualicum Beach, Sidney, Smithers and View Royal – meet the requirement of having populations greater than 5,000 to incorporate as a city.

See also 
List of communities in British Columbia
List of municipalities in British Columbia
List of cities in British Columbia
List of district municipalities in British Columbia
List of villages in British Columbia

References 

towns B